The Grafton Ballroom was an entertainment centre in Liverpool, England that on opened on 9 February 1924. it was a purpose-built dance hall able to accommodate 1,200 dancers. It was built next to the Locarno Ballroom which is now known as the Liverpool Olympia. It has for several years been under the same ownership as the Olympia.

Joe Loss, Victor Silvester, Henry Hall, Duke Ellington, Anathema and The Beatles have all played The Grafton.

In late September 2008 the Grafton closed as a dance venue, to be refurbished and reopened as a comedy club.

References

External links
 http://www.bbc.co.uk/liverpool/content/panoramas/grafton_ballroom_360.shtml
 http://www.liverpoololympia.com/welcome!.html

Cultural organisations based in Liverpool
Buildings and structures in Liverpool
Ballrooms in the United Kingdom
Event venues established in 1924